College of Agriculture, Food and Rural Enterprise (CAFRE) is a public tertiary level land-based college offering training in agriculture, food technology, horticulture, equine and agri-business operating at three sites in Northern Ireland.

The college is funded by the Department of Agriculture, Environment and Rural Affairs (DAERA) of the Northern Ireland Executive.

It is an associate member of the Landex consortium of "Land Based Colleges Aspiring to Excellence".

Campuses
 Greenmount Campus at Muckamore near Antrim in County Antrim (originally Greenmount College of Agriculture and Horticulture, founded in 1912).
 Enniskillen Campus at Levaghy near Enniskillen in County Fermanagh.
 Loughry Campus between Cookstown and Dungannon in County Tyrone (founded in 1908 as The Ulster Dairy School).

See also
 List of agricultural universities and colleges

References

External links
 
 Daily Telegraph: College of Agriculture, Food and Rural Enterprise guide

Further education colleges in Northern Ireland
Agriculture in Northern Ireland
Educational institutions established in 1908
Agricultural universities and colleges in the United Kingdom
1908 establishments in Ireland
Universities and colleges in Northern Ireland